Emma Karlotta Boermans (born 17 August 1999) is a German field hockey player, who plays as a forward.

Career

Club hockey
In the German Bundesliga, Boermans represents Rot-Weiss Köln.

National teams

Under–21
Emma Boermans made her debut for the German U–21 team in 2017 during a test series against Malaysia in Köln. 

In 2019, she represented the team at the EuroHockey Junior Championship in Valencia, where she won a bronze medal.

Die Danas
Boermans debuted for Die Danas in 2019, during the first season of the FIH Pro League.

She has since gone on to represent the national team in the second and third seasons of the FIH Pro League in 2021.

References

External links

1999 births
Living people
German female field hockey players
Rot-Weiss Köln players
Feldhockey Bundesliga (Women's field hockey) players